iCasualties.org, formally the Iraq Coalition Casualty Count,
is an independent website
created in May 2003 by Michael White, a software engineer from Stone Mountain, Georgia, to track casualties in the Afghanistan War and Iraq War.

The website compiles information on casualties incurred by the Multi-National Force (MNF) in Iraq and the International Security Assistance Force in Afghanistan using news reports and press releases from the U.S. Department of Defense, CENTCOM, the MNF, and the British Ministry of Defence.  The project has grown in scope since its conception, and now also provides fatality counts for contractors, Iraqi security forces (since January 2005), and Iraqi civilians (since March 2005).

The website is considered an "authoritative" record of MNF casualties in Iraq
and has been cited by, among others, the BBC, the Associated Press, Voice of America, The New York Times, and The Washington Post.

However, his number differs considerably from other counts regarding the Afghanistan War because many people assume his count for Operation Enduring Freedom means "the war in Afghanistan." In fact he includes deaths in all theaters of combat in Operation Enduring Freedom including Cuba, the Philippines and the Horn of Africa. White told The Takeaway that "Our count of U.S. fatalities in Operation Enduring Freedom has passed 1,000, however U.S. fatalities in and around Afghanistan remain under this benchmark."

White has stated that it costs him $500 per month to maintain the web site, and he will continue to maintain it as long as he can continue to raise the money necessary to cover the costs.

See also
Casualties of the conflict in Iraq since 2003
Coalition casualties in Afghanistan
Iraq Body Count project
Lancet surveys of casualties of the Iraq War

References

External links
Iraq Coalition Casualty Count
Operation Enduring Freedom: Coalition Casualties 

Military-themed websites
Internet properties established in 2003
War in Afghanistan (2001–2021) casualties
Iraq War casualties